Wenman Humfrey "Kit" Wykeham-Musgrave (1899–1989) was a Royal Navy officer who has the possibly unique distinction of having survived being torpedoed on three different ships on the same day.

He was born on 4 April 1899 at Barford, Warwick, Warwickshire, England, the son of  Herbert Wenman Wykeham-Musgrave and his wife Gertrude St. Aubyn Walrond, daughter of the Rev. Main Swete Alexander Walrond. He was educated at Royal Naval College, Osborne, Isle of Wight, and at Royal Naval College, Dartmouth

They were attacked by the German U-Boat U-9, which was under the command of Kapitänleutnant Otto Weddigen. Wykeham-Musgrave's daughter, Pru Bailey-Hamilton, recounted the tale of his torpedoing during a BBC interview in  2003:
"He went overboard when the Aboukir was going down and he swam like mad to  get away from the suction. He was then just getting on board the Hogue and she was torpedoed. He then went and swam to the Cressy and she was  also torpedoed. He eventually found a bit of driftwood, became  unconscious and was eventually picked up by a Dutch trawler."

The  U-Boat torpedoed all three ships within the space of an hour. Wykeham-Musgrave survived the war and re-joined the Royal Navy in 1939, reaching the rank of  commander.

See also
 Violet Jessop, ocean liner stewardess and nurse who survived three disastrous maritime incidents, notably aboard ,  and

References

1899 births
1989 deaths
People from Barford, Warwickshire
Royal Navy officers of World War I
Royal Navy officers of World War II
Graduates of Britannia Royal Naval College
People educated at the Royal Naval College, Osborne
Shipwreck survivors